Emil Seifert (28 April 1900 - 20 October 1973) was a Czech football manager and former player.

Seifert played for three teams based in the city of Prague. He won the Czechoslovak First League with Slavia Prague in 1925, 1929 and 1931. Seifert was a member of the Czechoslovakia national team and participated at the 1920 Summer Olympics and 1924 Summer Olympics.

After finishing his active career, Seifert started to work as a football manager. He coached most notably Slavia Prague. Under his management, Slavia won the Czechoslovak First League four times, in 1940, 1941, 1942 and 1943. He later led also the youth teams at Slavia.

References

External links
  SK Slavia Praha profile
  Profile at ČMFS website

1900 births
1973 deaths
Czech footballers
Czechoslovak footballers
Czechoslovakia international footballers
Olympic footballers of Czechoslovakia
Footballers at the 1920 Summer Olympics
Footballers at the 1924 Summer Olympics
SK Slavia Prague players
FK Viktoria Žižkov players
Czech football managers
Czechoslovak football managers
SK Slavia Prague managers
Association football midfielders
Footballers from Prague
People from the Kingdom of Bohemia